Jonny Staub (born November 28, 1979 in Windsor, Ontario) is a Canadian radio and television personality.

Staub started his career as a traffic reporter at CHYM-FM in Kitchener, ON, on May 15, 1997. He attended Conestoga College and has achieved success mainly in Western Canada, both in Top 40 radio and for TV stations Citytv and Shaw TV.

In 2001, at age 22, he was the youngest DJ in a major time slot in the Vancouver market. He was removed from his position at Z95 in May 2002. Soon after, he landed a weekend time slot at Power 92 in Edmonton. In 2005, he was a featured host for the newly airing Edmonton station The Bounce.

He has been a DJ at CHYM-FM, CKGL, CJIB, CKIK-FM, CKZZ-FM (in the evening time), CKNG-FM, CHBN-FM, and CFBT-FM.

Staub is also one of Canada's first openly gay DJs in the Vancouver radio market. In 2008 he co-hosted OUTtv's Let's Talk Sex, which also airs on its US counterpart here!. There is talk of a second season of Let's Talk Sex; however, there is no word on whether or not Staub will return to that show.  Recently Jonny has ventured online and started blogging on Homorazzi.com, a site where 'homos judge everything' - think Perez Hilton meets The Hills. As part of the Homorazzi.com team, Jonny hosts weekly segments called "Hawt Topics".

References

External links
Jonny Staub's Beat Bio (CFBT-FM web site)
Let's Talk Sex show site (OUT TV web site)
Jonny Staub's Blog (Homorazzi.com)

Canadian television journalists
Canadian LGBT entertainers
Journalists from Ontario
People from Windsor, Ontario
1979 births
Living people
Canadian LGBT broadcasters
Conestoga College alumni